The Cigar Factory is a building on the National Historical Register. Located at 701 East Bay Street, Charleston, South Carolina, USA, it was constructed in 1881 and opened in 1882 as the Cotton Mill of Charleston. In 1912, it was purchased by the American Cigar Company who converted it into a cigar factory that was the largest private employer in Charleston during the 1930s. In the 1940s, it was the location of the 1945–1946 Charleston Cigar Factory strike where the civil rights anthem "We Shall Overcome" emerged.

A $30 million redevelopment of the structure began in 2014. By 2017, the factory was mostly leased. Current businesses in the building include restaurants, salons, an event venue, and an ophthalmologist's office.

References

National Historic Landmarks in South Carolina
National Register of Historic Places in Charleston, South Carolina
Buildings and structures in Charleston, South Carolina
Industrial buildings and structures on the National Register of Historic Places in South Carolina
Historic cigar factories
Tobacco buildings in the United States